Mariona Illamola i Dausà (born 11 January 1967) is a Catalan academic, politician and a member of the Congress of Deputies of Spain.

Early life
Illamola was born on 11 January 1967 in Tossa de Mar, Catalonia. She has a degree in law from the University of Navarra (1990). She has a special degree in international and European law from the Université catholique de Louvain (1991) and a doctorate in law from the University of Girona (2001).

Career
Illamola is an associate professor at the University of Girona's Department of Public Law, specialising in public international law and international relations. She is the co-ordinator for the university's master's programme on advocacy. She was director of the university's Centro de Documentación Europea (2006-2019) and Europe Direct Girona (2013-2019). She was also head of the bar association of Girona, Figueres and Vic (2013-2016). She is a member of the Asociación Española de Profesores de Derecho Internacional y Relaciones Internacionales (AEPDIRI) and Asociación para la Investigación del Derecho de Asilo y Migratorio (AIDAM).

Illamola contested the November 2019 general election as an Independent Together for Catalonia electoral alliance candidate in the Province of Girona and was elected to the Congress of Deputies.

Electoral history

References

External links

1967 births
Academics from Catalonia
Women politicians from Catalonia
Independent politicians in Catalonia
Living people
Members of the 14th Congress of Deputies (Spain)
People from Selva
Together for Catalonia (2017) politicians
Université catholique de Louvain alumni
University of Girona alumni
Academic staff of the University of Girona
University of Navarra alumni
Women members of the Congress of Deputies (Spain)